Randy Pie was a moderately successful German rock / funk band based in Hamburg, which was active between 1972 and 1977, and briefly in 1986. Formed by Dicky Tarrach, and mostly originating as ex-members of the pop group The Rattles they started as the Randy Pie & Family. Deep Purple's then guitarist Ritchie Blackmore was guested on their single "Hurry to the City".
Later they simplified their name into Randy Pie. Many of the musicians in Randy Pie were also involved in the experimental rock albums of Achim Reichel. Bassist Manfred Thiers had come from the hard-rock progressive band Gash.
In 2009, singer - guitarist Bernd Wippich launched Randy Pie Reloaded, on which he was the only Randy Pie musician. Wippich died in March 2014

Discography
Randy Pie (1973)
Highway Driver (1974)
Kitsch (1975)
Dance (If You Want It) part 1 & 2 (single, 1976) 
England England (live album, 1976)
Fast Forward (1977)
Magic Ferry (1986)

References

External links

Randy pie at All Music
A short page about Randy Pie
Official Website of Jean-Jacques Kravetz

German rock music groups
Musical groups from Hamburg